This is a list of women senators of the Philippines. It is a guide to identify the women in the Philippines who has served as senators in the Senate of the Philippines, as distinct from the existing whole list of Philippine senators.

Since 1947, there have been 23 Filipino women senators in Philippine history. In the ongoing 19th Congress, there are 7 incumbent female senators.

History 

The first female senator elected in the Philippines was Geronima Pecson, who reaped the third largest number of votes during the Philippine senatorial elections of 1947. During her senatorial term, Pecson headed the Senate Committee on Education, the Senate Committee on Health and Public Welfare, and the Joint Congressional Committee on Education.

Eva Estrada-Kalaw was the first woman to be re-elected as senator.

Nikki Coseteng was the youngest senator during the 9th and 10th Congress. She was first elected in 1992 and then re-elected in 1995.

Loren Legarda is the first Filipino woman senator to top the Senate race twice in 1998 and 2007. She also became the first Filipino woman to become Majority Floor Leader of the Senate. She was also the youngest senator during the 11th Congress.

Pia Cayetano is the youngest woman elected senator in Philippine history at the age of 38. She was elected in 2004, then re-elected in 2010. She returned to the Senate in 2019.

Loi Ejercito Estrada became the first First Spouse (to Joseph Ejercito Estrada) to be elected in the Senate. She served from 2001 to 2007 after her husband's removal from the presidency in 2001.

Leticia Ramos-Shahani became the first Filipino woman to become President pro tempore of the Senate in 1993.

Santanina Rasul is the first Filipina Muslim senator.

Tecla San Andres Ziga was the first woman in the Philippines to top the bar examinations for law degree graduates. She was elected as a senator in 1963.

Miriam Defensor Santiago was the first Filipino and first Asian from a developing country to be elected as a judge of the International Criminal Court (ICC) on December 12, 2011. She later resigned the post due to chronic fatigue syndrome, which turned out to be lung cancer.

Gloria Macapagal Arroyo was the first female senator who was elected as Vice President (1998–2001) and later installed to the presidency (2001–2010).

Risa Hontiveros is the Philippines' first socialist woman senator, representing the Akbayan party.

Female senators
 denotes incumbent senator

Timeline of female senators

Per Congress

References

External links

Members of the Senate of the Philippines
List
Political history of the Philippines
Philippines
Senators
Senators female